Sophia Julieta Dominguez-Heithoff (born March 13, 2000) is an American model and beauty pageant titleholder who was crowned Miss Teen USA 2017. She is the second entrant from Missouri to win the title after Marissa Whitley won Miss Teen USA 2001.

Life and career

Early life and education
Dominguez-Heithoff was born in Kansas City, Missouri to a military family, with her mother serving in the United States Air Force. On her maternal side she is of German descent, while on her paternal side she is Mexican. She graduated from Park Hill South High School a year early in 2017, and attended the University of Kansas, where she studied political science and international studies and was a member of Phi Beta Kappa (ΦΒΚ) honor society. She is now a law student at the University of Southern California Gould School of Law. She is a member of Pi Beta Phi (ΠΒΦ) sorority.

Dominguez-Heithoff has created Community and Scholars Cooperatively, an organization dedicated to inspiring teenagers to take part in community service projects. Dominguez-Heithoff has lobbied with members of the Missouri Senate and Missouri House of Representatives to pass a law to assist adults with developmental disabilities in the state of Missouri.

Pageantry
Dominguez-Heithoff was crowned Miss Missouri Teen USA 2017 on September 25, 2016, along with Miss Missouri USA 2017 Bayleigh Dayton. She later competed at Miss Teen USA 2017 in Phoenix, Arizona on July 29, 2017. Dominguez-Heithoff went on to win the competition, beating out first runner-up Vanessa Matheson of Oregon. She is the third Hispanic person to win the title of Miss Teen USA after Charlotte Lopez in 1993, and Hilary Cruz in 2007.

References

2000 births
Activists from Missouri
American beauty pageant winners
American people of German descent
American people of Mexican descent
American disability rights activists
Female models from Missouri
Hispanic and Latino American female models
Living people
Miss Teen USA winners
People from Kansas City, Missouri
University of Kansas alumni
USC Gould School of Law alumni
21st-century American women